Alma Lucy Reville, Lady Hitchcock (14 August 1899 – 6 July 1982), was an English director, editor, and screenwriter. She was the wife of the film director Alfred Hitchcock. She collaborated on scripts for her husband's films, including Shadow of a Doubt, Suspicion, and The Lady Vanishes, as well as scripts for other directors, including Henrik Galeen, Maurice Elvey, and Berthold Viertel.

Early life and career
Reville was born on 14 August 1899 in Nottingham (one day after her future husband), the second daughter of Matthew Edward and Lucy Reville. The family moved to London when Reville was young, as her father gained a job at Twickenham Film Studios. Reville often visited her father at work and eventually obtained a job there as a tea girl. At 16, she was promoted to the position of cutter, which involved assisting directors in editing the motion pictures. Of editing, she wrote, "The art of cutting is Art indeed, with a capital A, and is of far greater importance than is generally acknowledged." She continued to work there as a scriptwriter and director's assistant. These roles enabled her to become involved in areas of film-making to which women would then rarely have access.

Twickenham Film Studio, where Reville first worked, closed in 1919, but she was given a job at Paramount's Famous Players-Lasky, a subsidiary of the American company based in Islington, where she met her future husband, Alfred Hitchcock. The same company gave him a job as a graphic designer before he became an art editor. The first film Reville worked on with Hitchcock was Woman to Woman (1923), with Reville as film editor, and Hitchcock as art director and assistant editor.

As well as editing, writing and other production roles, Reville also appeared on screen making three film appearances: a lead role in The Life Story of David Lloyd George (1918), and as an extra in Hitchcock's The Lodger: A Story of the London Fog (1927) and Sabotage (1936).

Marriage and collaborations

Hitchcock and Reville married on 2 December 1926 at Brompton Oratory in London after Reville converted to Roman Catholicism from Protestantism, apparently at the behest of Hitchcock's mother. Reville was baptized on 31 May 1927 and confirmed at Westminster Cathedral by Cardinal Francis Bourne on 5 June. In 1928, when they learned that she was pregnant, the Hitchcocks purchased "Winter's Grace", a Tudor farmhouse set in 11 acres (4.45 ha) on Stroud Lane, Shamley Green, Surrey, for £2,500. Their daughter and only child, Patricia Alma Hitchcock, was born on 7 July that year.

Reville co-wrote The Ring (1927) – the first screenwriting credit she shared with Hitchcock – but worked with other directors as well. She co-wrote The Constant Nymph (1928), the first film adaptation of the best-selling novel The Constant Nymph (1924) by Margaret Kennedy, directed by Adrian Brunel. In 1929, Reville co-wrote After the Verdict, directed by Henrik Galeen and A Romance of Seville, directed by Norman Walker. In 1931 and 1932 she worked with directors such as Harry Lachman, Maurice Elvey and Basil Dean. In 1933, Hitchcock hired Joan Harrison as his assistant, and she assumed many of Reville's roles within his productions. She continued to work with some other directors, including Phil Rosen in 1934, Berthold Viertel in 1935 and Richard Wallace in 1945. Reville focused primarily on preparing and adapting her husband's scripts, including those for Rebecca, Foreign Correspondent (both 1940), Suspicion (1941) and Saboteur (1942).

Reville worked with her husband on many more scripts in Hollywood. She collaborated with Joan Harrison on the script of Suspicion, which was completed on 28 November 1940. They worked on it in the Hitchcocks' home in Bel Air, as Hitchcock preferred writing in a comfortable, intimate environment rather than an office.

Reville had a keen ear for dialogue and an editor's sharp eye for scrutinising a film's final version for continuity flaws so minor they had escaped the notice of the director or the crew. It was Reville who noticed Janet Leigh inadvertently swallowing after her character's fatal encounter in Psycho (1960), necessitating an alteration to the negative.

Reville was Hitchcock's closest collaborator and sounding board. Charles Champlin wrote in 1982: "The Hitchcock touch had four hands, and two were Alma's." When Hitchcock accepted the AFI Life Achievement Award in 1979, he said he wanted to mention "four people who have given me the most affection, appreciation and encouragement, and constant collaboration. The first of the four is a film editor, the second is a scriptwriter, the third is the mother of my daughter, Pat, and the fourth is as fine a cook as ever performed miracles in a domestic kitchen. And their names are Alma Reville".

Death
Reville survived a bout of breast cancer. She died on 6 July 1982, at the age of 82, two years after her husband. She was cremated and her ashes scattered in the Pacific Ocean.

In popular culture
Reville was portrayed by Imelda Staunton in The Girl (2012), and Helen Mirren in Hitchcock (2012). Staunton was nominated for a BAFTA and a Primetime Emmy for her performance, while Mirren was nominated for BAFTA, Golden Globe and SAG awards for her performance.

Legacy
In 1999, on the 100th anniversary of her birth, a plaque to Reville was unveiled in Nottingham, near the site of her birth, as part of the British Film Institute's "Centenary of Cinema" celebrations.

Selected filmography
Reville wrote or co-wrote many screenplays, including:

References

Bibliography

External links

Alma Reville: The Power Behind Hitchcock’s Throne at Brenton Film

1899 births
1982 deaths
American Roman Catholics
American screenwriters
American women film directors
Converts to Roman Catholicism from Protestantism
English expatriates in the United States
English Roman Catholics
English women film directors
English film editors
People from Nottingham
Alfred Hitchcock
Wives of knights
American women film editors
American film editors
20th-century American screenwriters
20th-century English screenwriters
20th-century English businesspeople
Women film pioneers
British women film editors